In metric geometry, a geodesic bicombing distinguishes a class of geodesics of a metric space. The study of metric spaces with distinguished geodesics traces back to the work of the mathematician Herbert Busemann. The convention to call a collection of paths of a metric space bicombing is due to William Thurston. By imposing a weak global non-positive curvature condition on a geodesic bicombing several results from the theory of CAT(0) spaces and Banach space theory may be recovered in a more general setting.

Definition 
Let  be a metric space.

Different classes of geodesic bicombings 
A geodesic bicombing  is:

Examples 
Examples of metric spaces with a conical geodesic bicombing include:

 Banach spaces.
 CAT(0) spaces.
 injective metric spaces.
the spaces  where  is the first Wasserstein distance.
 any ultralimit or 1-Lipschitz retraction of the above.

Properties 

Every consistent conical geodesic bicombing is convex.
Every convex geodesic bicombing is conical, but the reverse implication does not hold in general. 
 Every proper metric space with a conical geodesic bicombing admits a convex geodesic bicombing.
 Every complete metric space with a conical geodesic bicombing admits a reversible conical geodesic bicombing.

References 

Metric geometry
Geodesic (mathematics)